Lieutenant General Nasser Moghaddam (24 June 1921 – 11 April 1979) was the fourth and last chief of SAVAK (6 June 1978 – 12 February 1979). He succeeded General Nematollah Nassiri, who was arrested by the Shah's order in 1978. Moghaddam was convicted for corruption and sentenced to death under Ayatollah Khomeini's order on 11 March 1979, along with Nassiri and Nassiri's predecessor, Hassan Pakravan.

Early life
Nasser Moghaddam was born in 1921, in Tehran, Qajar Iran. He studied at the military high school, and went on to study law at the Faculty of Tehran University.

Until the age of 10, Nasser grew up with his father, and until 1935, for some reason, he lived with his uncle Hussein (mother's brother), who did not treat Nasser very well. So he decided to return home.

In 1928, he entered the primary school and in 1934, the military school of Tehran, which he graduated from in 1940.

In the last year of Reza Shah's reign, in 1941, he enrolled in the Officers' School, where he studied until 1943. He graduated from the officers' academy with the rank of 2nd rank lieutenant and decided to continue his studies at the Faculty of law of the University of Tehran.

At the Officers' School, as well as at the University of Tehran, he not only mastered the basics of military and security, but also studied French and English languages well.

Career in army and intelligence services 
At the Officers' School, Nasser met Hossein Fardoust, which he considered to be the best event of his life – probably because the Shah's and Fardoust's recent friendship was also reflected in his career growth. In any case, thanks to an acquaintance with Fardoust, until 1964, Nasser served in various divisions of the army, including: the 10th Division of Khorasan and the 5th Division of Luristan; In the Shah's Guard; At the Ministry of Defense; At the Military Prosecutor's Office and the Academy.

In 1959, the «Special Intelligence Bureau» was established in Iran. General Hossein Fardoust offered to Moghaddam cooperate with him, to which he agreed.

Uprising of 15 Khordad 
After the suppression of the 15 Khordad uprising, General Fardoust took advantage of the situation and asked the Shah to dismiss Mustafa Amjadi, the director general of the Department of internal security, and appoint Moghaddam to the post. The Shah, considering that Amjadi had a close relationship with Teymur Bakhtiar, accepted the Fardoust's proposal. Moghaddam worked as the director of the third Department for about 10 years. His duties included monitoring the activities of revolutionary groups and informing the Shah about his public mood on a weekly basis, which he reportedly did well.

Second Bureau of Intelligence and Counterintelligence  
In 1971, Lieutenant General Nasser Moghaddam was promoted to director of the Army's Second Bureau of Intelligence and Counterintelligence.

On 19 April 1973, General Moghaddam was appointed Deputy Director General of Intelligence and Counterintelligence, General Azizollah Palizban. "The work of Nasser Moghaddam in SAVAK has been completed and he will be appointed as the head of the Information Bureau of the 2nd Bureau by retaining the position of Adjutant to the Shah," it was said the order.

Military ranks
Moghaddam's military ranks:
 25 October 1966 – Brigadier General
 23 October 1970 – Division General (Sarlashgar)
 25 October 1971 – Shah's personal adjutant.

General Moghaddam at the head of SAVAK (June 1978 – February 1979) 

In April 1978, General Moghaddam sent a confidential letter to the Shah urging the monarch: "Under the current circumstances, the welfare of the country requires the exemplary punishment of some government officials close to the royal family in corrupt machinations. It is also important to have a constructive dialogue with the clergy”. Numerous data also show that CIA for many years has been funding the General Moghaddam.

To defuse the tense situation, the Shah made concessions to the Iranian public (at Washington's urgent request) and in June 1978 removed the director of SAVAK, the almighty Nassiri. The new head of the secret police was appointed Lieutenant General Nasser Mogadam, who had good contacts in the ranks of the opposition camp, including among the Shiite clergy.

Many Iranians in our present time have called the Shah's decision a mistake, as the Security Service was weakened. The threat came from completely different forces. Moghaddam, unlike General Nassiri, was in favor of a constructive dialogue with the religious opposition. At the same time, it is noteworthy that Moghaddam had ties to opposition camps, including Shiite clerics.

General Mogadam was previously the head of the military counterintelligence, was considered an opponent of torture, and his appointment was to ensure better integration of the army with the secret service.

Upon his appointment, Moghaddam set out to destroy Nematollah Nassiri, who was then iranian ambassador to Pakistan. There are reports that the CIA was pressuring Nassiri and his supporters to remove them from the intelligence service, and that the only real candidate to replace them was Nasser Moghaddam. A former SAVAK officer who is currently in exile focuses on one detail during the interview: "... Yes, Nassiri's dismissal was a major mistake on the part of the Shah. However, no less a mistake was the dismissal of his deputy, General Ali Motazed ... ". It can be said that with the arrival of Moghaddam, the "Iron rule" of SAVAK ended.

General Moghaddam, when still serving as the army's chief of counterintelligence, opposed the use of torture during interrogations, and his appointment to the above-mentioned position, Shah suggested that the would integrate the army and the SAVAK. Moghaddam believed that he played an important role in the implementation of democratic reforms in the armed forces. For example, the Mogaddam allowed lawyers to attend interrogations of the defendants.

After the riots of 21–22 July 1978, the Shah invited two generals to the meeting – Fardoust and Moghaddam – to discuss an action plan against the protesters, but the meeting was unsuccessful.

Barzan Ibrahim al-Tikriti secret mission to Tehran (September 1978) 
Shortly after the appointment of Moghaddam, a meeting was held between senior SAVAK officials and the Iraqi intelligence service leadership, during which the Iranian side raised the issue of neutralizing Ayatolla Khomeini's political activity. Iraqi officials have expressed full solidarity on the issue. It is important to note that in the first days of September 1978, the Director of Iraqi Intelligence, Barzan Ibrahim al-Tikriti, arrived in Tehran on a secret mission. He conveyed Saddam Hussein's proposal to the Shah : "His Majesty must put down the revolt with an iron fist, and if you (the Shah) need help in this matter, Iraq is ready to stand by you." Barzan Ibrahim al-Tikriti offered the Shah to kill Khomeini, who was then living in Najaf. On the advice of Hossein Fardoust and Nasser Moghaddam, the Shah refused to accept Saddam Hussein's offer. Soon after, Khomeini was expelled from the country and settled in France. While Khomeini was in Iraq, it was much easier to control his activities. In France, however, there was no way to do that. Western media have portrayed Khomeini as a global figure. Israeli intelligence officer Reuven Merhav later noted that the Shah did not understand the consequences of his decision.

Iranian Revolution
The outbreak of the revolutionary wave was followed by the outflow of security and military officials from the country. For example, Parviz Sabeti, who was in charge of the 3rd Department, left the country on 27 November. General Gholam Ali Oveissi and Tehran Police Chief General Moulavi left Iran in January 1979 and moved to the United States.

On 16 January 1979, the Shah and his family left Iran. On 1 February, Khomeini returned from exile and personally led the revolutionary process.  After three days of fighting against the Shah's Imperial Guard, Khomeini seized control.

After the victory of the revolution, Mehdi Bazargan's representatives contacted Moghaddam and offered to take part in the formation of a new security service, where he would hold one of the leading positions. Moghaddam agreed to this proposal. He later recalled: "It seems that Bazargan will thank for the kindness I have done for him." At the same time, Moghaddam tried to destroy all the documents in which he appeared as a participant in the repressions.

On 15 February, after the shooting of former SAVAK director Nematohla Nassiri, Moghaddam realized that his case was over and decided to disappear for a while and leave the country at the first opportunity, but was soon captured and handed over to the Revolutionary Tribunal. The efficiency of the new security has even surprised the Moghaddam: “What smart people. If they were my employees at SAVAK, I would be much more successful”.

While in prison, Moghaddam hoped to be released soon and, with the support of Mehdi Bazargan, would receive a good position, however, on 11 April 1979, by order of the Islamic Revolutionary Tribunal, General Nasser Moghaddam was shot.

References

Bibliography

External links
 Treaty Concerning the State Frontier and Neighbourly Relationships between Iran and Iraq (Done 6 March 1975 in Baghdad; in force 22 June 1976)
 Answer to History by Mohammad Reza Pahlavi 

Imperial Iranian Army lieutenant generals
1921 births
1979 deaths
People executed by Iran by firearm
Government ministers of Iran
Directors of SAVAK
Military personnel executed during the Iranian Revolution
Politicians from Tehran